List of UK top-ten singles is a series of lists showing all the singles that have reached the top 10 on the UK Singles Chart in a particular year. Before 1969, there was no single officially recognised chart, but the New Musical Express (1952–1959) and Record Retailer (1960–1969) are considered the canonical source for the data.

Elvis Presley holds the record for the most top 10 singles of all time, followed by Cliff Richard and Madonna.

1950s
List of UK top-ten singles in 1952
List of UK top-ten singles in 1953
List of UK top-ten singles in 1954
List of UK top-ten singles in 1955
List of UK top-ten singles in 1956
List of UK top-ten singles in 1957
List of UK top-ten singles in 1958
List of UK top-ten singles in 1959

1960s
List of UK top-ten singles in 1960
List of UK top-ten singles in 1961
List of UK top-ten singles in 1962
List of UK top-ten singles in 1963
List of UK top-ten singles in 1964
List of UK top-ten singles in 1965
List of UK top-ten singles in 1966
List of UK top-ten singles in 1967
List of UK top-ten singles in 1968
List of UK top-ten singles in 1969

1970s
List of UK top-ten singles in 1970
List of UK top-ten singles in 1971
List of UK top-ten singles in 1972
List of UK top-ten singles in 1973
List of UK top-ten singles in 1974
List of UK top-ten singles in 1975
List of UK top-ten singles in 1976
List of UK top-ten singles in 1977
List of UK top-ten singles in 1978
List of UK top-ten singles in 1979

1980s
List of UK top-ten singles in 1980
List of UK top-ten singles in 1981
List of UK top-ten singles in 1982
List of UK top-ten singles in 1983
List of UK top-ten singles in 1984
List of UK top-ten singles in 1985
List of UK top-ten singles in 1986
List of UK top-ten singles in 1987
List of UK top-ten singles in 1988
List of UK top-ten singles in 1989

1990s
List of UK top-ten singles in 1990
List of UK top-ten singles in 1991
List of UK top-ten singles in 1992
List of UK top-ten singles in 1993
List of UK top-ten singles in 1994
List of UK top-ten singles in 1995
List of UK top-ten singles in 1996
List of UK top-ten singles in 1997
List of UK top-ten singles in 1998
List of UK top-ten singles in 1999

2000s
List of UK top-ten singles in 2000
List of UK top-ten singles in 2001
List of UK top-ten singles in 2002
List of UK top-ten singles in 2003
List of UK top-ten singles in 2004
List of UK top-ten singles in 2005
List of UK top-ten singles in 2006
List of UK top-ten singles in 2007
List of UK top-ten singles in 2008
List of UK top-ten singles in 2009

2010s
List of UK top-ten singles in 2010
List of UK top-ten singles in 2011
List of UK top-ten singles in 2012
List of UK top-ten singles in 2013
List of UK top-ten singles in 2014
List of UK top-ten singles in 2015
List of UK top-ten singles in 2016
List of UK top-ten singles in 2017
List of UK top-ten singles in 2018
List of UK top-ten singles in 2019

2020s
List of UK top-ten singles in 2020
List of UK top-ten singles in 2021
List of UK top-ten singles in 2022
List of UK top-ten singles in 2023